A Collection of Short Stories may refer to Short story collections more generally or specifically to:
 A Collection of Short Stories (Houston Calls album)
 A Collection of Short Stories (Reload album)